McKibbin is a surname. Notable people with the surname include:

 Aaron McKibbin (born 1991), English Paralympic table tennis player
 Alan McKibbin (1892–1958), Northern Ireland politician
 Brendan McKibbin (born 1985), Scottish rugby player
 David B. McKibbin (1831–1890), American army officer
 John McKibbin (1947–2016), American politician
 Joseph C. McKibbin (1824–1896), American politician
 Nikki McKibbin (1978-2020), American singer-songwriter
 Ross McKibbin (born 1942), historian of Britain
 Tom McKibbin (1870–1939), Australian cricketer
 Warwick McKibbin (born 1957), Australian economist

See also
 248 McKibbin
 Industrial Complex at 221 McKibbin Street
 McKibben (disambiguation)